Adrien Courtois (28 November 1905 – 29 January 1981) was a French racewalker. He competed in the men's 50 kilometres walk at the 1936 Summer Olympics.

References

1905 births
1981 deaths
Athletes (track and field) at the 1936 Summer Olympics
French male racewalkers
Olympic athletes of France
Place of birth missing